Ophichthus humanni is an eel in the family Ophichthidae (worm/snake eels). It was described by John E. McCosker in 2010. It is a marine, deep water-dwelling eel which is known from Vanuatu, in the western Pacific Ocean.

Etymology
The eel is named in honor of author and underwater photographer Paul Humann (b. 1937), who has supplied ichthyologists with his photographs and in the wild observations.

References

humanni
Taxa named by John E. McCosker
Fish described in 2010